Eros Poli (born 6 August 1963 in Isola della Scala, Veneto) is an Italian former professional racing cyclist of the 1990s, notably employed as Mario Cipollini's lead-out man in bunch sprints.

Biography 
Poli won the gold medal in the Team Time Trial at the 1984 Summer Olympics in Los Angeles, together with Claudio Vandelli, Marcello Bartalini and Marco Giovannetti. He also rode at the 1988 Summer Olympics.

Following Cipollini's abandonment of the 1994 Tour de France, Poli won the Montpellier to Carpentras stage (the 15th) which featured an ascent of Mont Ventoux. Poli calculated that if he broke away from the peloton by a sufficient margin on the flat run to the base of the climb of the Mont Ventoux, he would reach the summit in front in spite of his relatively poor climbing speed due to his heavy 197 cm frame. In the event, his gap of some 20 minutes was nearly closed, but he crested the climb in front and was not caught by the chasing pack on the run down to the finish of the stage in Carpentras. In that Tour, Poli won the Combativity award.

Poli rode mainly in the days before cycle helmets were compulsory in professional racing, and normally wore a casquette from which he cut out the top part, leaving just the elasticated headband and the peak to shade his eyes from the sun.

He was praised for his calculated cycling style and called the "bus driver", by cyclists such Chris Boardman, for his ability to lead the gruppetto through tough stages, ensuring they all reached the cut-off time. When asked by Cycle Sport magazine what he would like his epitaph to be, he said "Here lies Eros Poli, famous for being tall and coming last in the Giro d'Italia".

Major results

1984
1st Olympic Games, Team Time Trial
1987
1st World Amateur Team Time Trial Championship
1992
1st Stage 7 Alpine Tour, Australia
1994
Tour de France
1st Stage 15
 Combativity classification
 Combativity award Stages 7 & 15
1997
4th Overall Étoile de Bessèges
1998
1st Dun Le Palestel Criterium

References

External links 

Official Tour de France results for Eros Poli
An interview with Poli at Cyclingnews.com
An interview with Poli at http://ruedalenticular.blogspot.com
 
 
 

1963 births
Cyclists at the 1984 Summer Olympics
Cyclists at the 1988 Summer Olympics
Italian male cyclists
Italian Tour de France stage winners
Living people
Olympic cyclists of Italy
Olympic gold medalists for Italy
Olympic medalists in cycling
Cyclists from the Province of Verona
UCI Road World Champions (elite men)
Medalists at the 1984 Summer Olympics